Maximilian Hofmann (born 7 August 1993) is an Austrian footballer who currently plays for Rapid Wien.

Career
Hofmann began his youth career with local side SV Wienerberg before joining Rapid Wien in 2003. He advanced through the club's youth system and made his debut for the second team  in a 5-0 win against SC Ritzing in Regional League East on 7 October 2011. He made his first-team debut as a late substitute in a 3-0 win against SV Ried on 26 May 2013.

Hofmann's first league start, and third competitive appearance, for Rapid Wien saw him give away a penalty and receive a red card within the first 90 seconds of a 4-2 win against SK Sturm Graz on 4 August 2013.

Career statistics

References

1993 births
Living people
Association football defenders
Austrian footballers
Austria under-21 international footballers
Austrian Football Bundesliga players
SK Rapid Wien players
Footballers from Vienna